Arūnas Gelažninkas (born 12 October 1985) is a Lithuanian motocross, enduro and rally raid rider. Gelažninkas is best known for being a multiple Lithuanian enduro and cross-country champion, 2019 Tuareg Rally champion as well winning 2021 Dakar Rally in Original by Motul category (formerly known as Malle Moto), making him the first and only Lithuanian to do so.

Biography 
A. Gelažninkas started his career in motocross when he was eight and was competing domestically initially. In 2005 Gelažninkas started training in United Kingdom and competing in British Motocross Championship. In addition to competing locally Gelažninkas has also participated in various events internationally, including representing Lithuania in Motocross of Nations, also competing in MX1, MX3 FIM Motocross World Championship as well as participating in Dakar Rally annually since 2019.

Over the years Gelažninkas achieved multiple victories and podium finishes competing in various disciplines in various competitions across the Baltic states, European and World Motocross Championships.

Career highlights 

 1995 - Lithuanian champion 65cc class
 1996 - Lithuanian champion 80cc class, 2nd place 65cc class
 1997 - 2nd place in Lithuania 80cc class
 1998 - Lithuanian champion 80cc class
 1999 - 2nd in Lithuanian championship 80cc class and 2nd in the Baltic championship.
 2000 - Team Lithuania member in Motocross of Nations
 2001 - Lithuanian champion 125cc class
 2002 - 5th in European youth championship 125cc class, Lithuanian champion 125cc class
 2003 - 3rd in European youth championship 125cc class
 2004 - Lithuanian champion 125cc class, 2nd in Open class, European cup 125cc class stage victory, 3rd in Baltics in Open class
 2005 - 5th in British Masters championship.
 2011 - Team Lithuania member in Motocross of Nations
 2013 - Lithuanian champion Cross Country E2 class, 2nd in Enduro E2 class
 2014 - Lithuanian champion Cross Country E2 class, Lithuanian champion Enduro E2 class, Latvian champion Enduro E2 class, 2nd in Baltic Enduro E2 class
 2015 - Lithuanian champion Cross Country E2 class, Lithuanian champion Enduro E2 class, 2nd in Baltic Enduro E2 class
 2016 - Lithuanian champion Enduro E2 class.
 2017 - Lithuanian champion Enduro E1 class, 3rd in Cross Country E1 class.
 2018 - Baltic champion in Cross Country Enduro class, Lithuanian champion in Cross Country Enduro class and Enduro E2 class, Baltic Enduro Rally champion, Balkan Off-road Rally champion, 3rd-place finish in Baja Poland rally.
 2019 - Tuareg Rally champion
 2021 - Winner of Dakar Rally in Original by Motul category
 2022 - Winner of Dakar Rally in Original by Motul category

Dakar Rally results

References

External links 

 Official website

Lithuanian racing drivers
1985 births
Living people
Enduro riders
Off-road motorcycle racers
Dakar Rally motorcyclists
People from Kaunas District Municipality